Fares Abu Akel (born 8 February 1997) is an Israeli footballer who plays as a midfielder for Gabala in the Azerbaijan Premier League.

Club career
On 8 August 2022, Abu Akel made his debut in the Azerbaijan Premier League for Gabala match against Turan Tovuz.

References

External links
 

1997 births
Living people
Israeli footballers
Footballers from Umm al-Fahm
Hapoel Umm al-Fahm F.C. players
Hapoel Iksal F.C. players
F.C. Ashdod players
Gabala FC players
Liga Leumit players
Israeli Premier League players
Azerbaijan Premier League players
Israeli expatriate footballers
Expatriate footballers in Azerbaijan
Israeli expatriate sportspeople in Azerbaijan
Association football midfielders